Yoshinohana Masaki (born 4 September 1943 as Masanori Aikawa) is a former sumo wrestler from Taitō, Tokyo, Japan. He made his professional debut in September May 1959, and reached the top division in November 1964. His highest rank was maegashira 1. Upon retirement from active competition he became an elder in the Japan Sumo Association, under the name Inagawa. He reached the Sumo Association's mandatory retirement age in September 2008.

Career record

See also
Glossary of sumo terms
List of past sumo wrestlers
List of sumo tournament second division champions

References

1943 births
Living people
Japanese sumo wrestlers
People from Taitō
Sumo people from Tokyo